Ketazocine (INN), also known as ketocyclazocine, is a benzomorphan derivative used in opioid receptor research. Ketazocine, for which the receptor is named, is an exogenous opioid that binds to the κ opioid receptor.

Activation of this receptor is known to cause sleepiness, a decrease in pain sensation and (potentially) dysphoria, paranoia, and hallucinations. It also causes an increase in urine production because it inhibits the release of vasopressin. (Vasopressin is an endogenous substance that assists in regulating fluid and electrolyte balance in the body and decreases the amount of water released into the urine.)

Unlike other opioids, substances that only bind to the κ receptor theoretically do not depress the respiratory system.

The crystal structure of ketazocine was determined in 1983.

See also 
 Benzomorphan
 Ethylketazocine

References 

Benzomorphans
Kappa-opioid receptor agonists
Ketones
Phenols
Synthetic opioids